Pietro Genga (born January 9, 1971 in Taranto) is an Italian sport shooter. He competed at the 2000 Summer Olympics in the men's skeet event, in which he tied for 39th place.

References

1971 births
Living people
Skeet shooters
Italian male sport shooters
Shooters at the 2000 Summer Olympics
Olympic shooters of Italy